Elan Y. Journo (born January 1976) is an Israeli writer, specializing in American foreign policy. He is an Objectivist and a fellow at the Ayn Rand Institute and its Director of Policy Research.

Personal life and education 
Elan Journo was born in Jerusalem, Israel, and grew up in the United Kingdom. He studied at King's College London from 1994 to 1997, graduating with a Bachelor of Arts degree in Philosophy. He then earned a Master of Arts degree in Diplomacy from SOAS, University of London, studying international relations. Journo lives in Irvine, California. He has Israeli citizenship.

Career 
Journo joined the Ayn Rand Institute in 1999, becoming a core-courses instructor at the Institute's Objectivist Academic Center in 2005. In 2009, he was the editor of, and the main contributor to, Winning the Unwinnable War: America's Self-Crippled Response to Islamic Totalitarianism, a collection of essays arguing for an Objectivist approach to foreign policy. In 2010, he was appointed by the Institute as the Director of Policy Research, specializing in foreign policy. Journo was a 2013 Lincoln Fellow at The Claremont Institute, a conservative think-tank.

Journo has contributed articles to Arutz Sheva, The Journal of International Security Affairs, Foreign Policy, Fox News, the Los Angeles Times, the Chicago Sun-Times, the Houston Chronicle, the Journal of Diplomacy and International Relations, the Middle East Quarterly, and others. He has also made television and radio appearances on outlets such as Fox News and NPR.

See also 
 American philosophy
 Ethical egoism
 Objectivist movement
 Philosophical realism

References 

1976 births
21st-century American non-fiction writers
Alumni of King's College London
Alumni of SOAS University of London
American male journalists
Journalists from California
Israeli emigrants to the United States
Living people
Objectivism scholars
Objectivists
People from Irvine, California
21st-century American male writers